Club Atlético Albacete is a Spanish football team based in Albacete, in the autonomous community of Castile-La Mancha. Founded in 1962, they are the reserve team of Albacete Balompié and currently play in Primera Autonómica Preferente – Group 1, holding home games at Ciudad Deportiva Andrés Iniesta, with a capacity of 3,000 seats.

History
Founded in 1962 as Botas Iñiguez CF, the club started an affiliation with Albacete Balompié in 1974, being their farm team and then playing with the name of Atlético Albacete. From 1998 to 2018, it played with the name of Albacete "B" before returning to their previous name.

On 10 October 2019, Atlético Albacete appointed Mario Simón, a manager who had already coached the first team, as their new head coach.

Season to season
As an independent club, Botas Iñiguez CF

As an independent club, Club Atlético de Albacete

As the reserve team of Albacete Balompié

 28 seasons in Tercera División
 1 season in Tercera División RFEF

Current squad

References

External links
Official website 
Futbolme team profile 

Albacete Balompié
Football clubs in Castilla–La Mancha
Association football clubs established in 1962
Spanish reserve football teams
1962 establishments in Spain